Five Fingers, 5 Finger or variant, may refer to:

Film and television 
5 Fingers, a 1952 film directed by Joseph L. Mankiewicz.
Five Fingers (2005 film), a Malayalam film by Sanjeev Raj starring Kunchacko Boban and Karthika
Five Fingers (2006 film), a film written by Chad Thumann and Laurence Malkin and directed by Malkin
Five Fingers (American TV series), a 1959 American adventure-drama television series set in Europe during the Cold War that aired on NBC
Five Fingers (South Korean TV series), a 2012 South Korean TV series

Geography 
Five Fingers, New Brunswick, a community in Restigouche County, New Brunswick
Five Fingers Group, a mountain group near Vancouver, British Columbia
5 Fingers (Austria), an observation deck in the Austrian Alps
Five Finger Mountain (disambiguation), several mountains by that name
Five Finger Rapids on the river Yukon in Western Canada

Other 
FiveFingers, a type of shoe manufactured by Vibram
Starfruit, a fruit also known by the name 5 fingers